The seventh season of the Dutch reality singing competition The Voice of Holland premiered on 21 October 2016 on RTL4. Martijn Krabbé, Wendy van Dijk, and Jamai Loman all returned, as did Sanne Hans and Ali B as coaches. For this season, however, coaches Marco Borsato and Anouk were replaced by singers Guus Meeuwis and Waylon, respectively.

One of the important premises of the show is the quality of the singing talent. Four coaches, themselves popular performing artists, train the talents in their group and occasionally perform with them.  Talents are selected in blind auditions, where the coaches cannot see, but only hear the auditioner.

Pleun Bierbooms won the competition and Waylon became the winning coach.

Coaches

Sanne Hans and Ali B have returned for season 7. Dutch singers Waylon and Guus Meeuwis replace former judges Marco Borsato and Anouk.

Teams
Color key

Blind auditions

Color key

Episode 1 (21 October)

Episode 2 (28 October)

Episode 3 (4 November)

Episode 4 (11 November)

Episode 5 (18 November)

Episode 6 (25 November)

The Battle Rounds 

The Battle Rounds determine which artists from each team will advance to the Knockout Rounds. Two artists from within a team (and, for Team Waylon and Team Ali B, a group of three artists) will sing in a vocal battle against one other, and ultimately, six artists from each team will advance. New to this season, however, is the introduction of the Steal Room. While steals have returned, each artist that is stolen this season will sit in a designated seat in the Steal Room as they watch the other performances. If a coach has stolen one artist but later decides to steal another, the first artist will be replaced and eliminated by the newly-stolen artist. 
Color key:

The Knockouts 
Continuing from season 6, the Knockout Round determines which three artists from each team will advance to the final round of competition, the Live Shows. In this round, after an artist performs, he or she will sit in one of three seats above the stage. The first three artists performing from each team will sit down, but once the fourth artist performs, a coach has the choice of replacing the fourth artist with any artist sitting down or eliminating them immediately. Once all artists have performed, those who remain seated will advance to the Live Shows.

Color key
 – Contestant was eliminated, either immediately (indicated by a "—" in the "Switched with" column) or switched with another contestant
 – Contestant was not switched out and advanced to the Live Shows

The Live Shows 

The final phase of the competition, the Live Shows, began on 13 January 2017 and lasted until 17 February 2017. A new feature of the Live Shows is the judging of each performance by all four coaches with a number from one to ten. This number will then be averaged and combined with the public vote, ultimately giving a score to each artist. The six artists with the highest scores will be immediately saved, while the six artists with the lowest scores will be at risk of elimination. The public vote then determines which two artists among the six at risk will be eliminated.

Color key
 – Artist had one of the six lowest scores and was eliminated
 – Artist's score was among the top six, advancing them to the next Live round
 – Artist was voted through by the public vote after having one of the six lowest scores

Week 1: Top 12 (13 January)

Notes

  Backstage performance

Week 2: Top 10 (20 January)

Notes

  Backstage performance

Week 3: Top 8 (27 January)

Notes

  Backstage performance

Week 4: Top 7 (3 February)

Notes

  Backstage performance

Week 5: Semi-Final – Top 6 (10 February) 

Notes

  Backstage performance

Week 6: Final (17 February)

Notes

  Backstage performance

Elimination Chart

Overall
Color key
Artist's info

Result details

Team
Color key
Artist's info

Result details

Ratings

References

 
 

The Voice of Holland
2016 Dutch television seasons
2017 Dutch television seasons